High Society is the second album by the Silver Seas. The album was originally self-released in May 2006 under the band's previous name, the Bees, then rereleased in October 2007 by Cheap Lullaby under their current name. The song "Catch Yer Own Train" was featured in a first-season episode of AMC's Breaking Bad and is included on the soundtrack album Breaking Bad: Music From the Original Television Series (2010).

Track listing
All songs written by Daniel Tashian, except where noted.
 "The Country Life" – 2:39
 "High Society" – 2:44
 "Ms. November" – 2:10
 "Imaginary Girl" – 2:28
 "She Is Gone" – 3:14
 "Catch Yer Own Train" – 3:06
 "Tativille" – 2:38
 "We'll Go Walking" (Tashian, Jason Lehning) – 3:39
 "Hard Luck Tom" – 1:51
 "Dream of Love" – 3:37
 "The Broadway Lights" (Tashian, Lehning) – 3:52
 "Infinite Number of Monkeys" – 3:42 [2007 Bonus Track]
 "I Want to Live" – 3:55 [2007 Bonus Track]

Personnel
 John Deaderick: bass, vocals
 David Gehrke: drums, vocals
 Jason Lehning: piano, Juno-60, vocals
 Daniel Tashian: lead vocals, 12- and 6-string guitars, ukulele

Production notes
Recorded at Sound Emporium in Nashville, Tenn., by Zachary Dycus and Bart Morris, May 11–12, 2005; additional recording by Patrick Granado, Jason Lehning, and Daniel Tashian. Mixed by Lehning at the Compound. Mastered by Jim DeMain at Yes Master Studios. Sleeve design by Carl Tashian; watercolors by Mary Sperling.

References

2006 albums
The Silver Seas albums